The Foucault–Habermas debate is a dispute concerning whether Michel Foucault's ideas of "power analytics" and "genealogy" or Jürgen Habermas' ideas of "communicative rationality" and "discourse ethics" provide a better critique of the nature of power in society. The debate compares and evaluates the central ideas of Habermas and Foucault as they pertain to questions of power, reason, ethics, modernity, democracy, civil society, and social action.

Overview 
The debate was a dialogue between texts and followers; Foucault and Habermas did not actually debate in person, though they were considering a formal one in the U.S. before Foucault's death in 1984. Habermas' essay Taking Aim at the Heart of the Present (1984) was altered before release in order to account for Foucault's inability to reply. Habermas wrote:

Nancy Fraser's contentious, but oft-quoted, claim that Foucault's work is a mixture of "empirical insights and normative confusions" exemplifies the most common strategy of critique by those favouring Habermas. It attempts to demonstrate the incoherence of Foucault's practice of critical reflection while at the same time appropriating those aspects considered valuable. Demonstrating this incoherence is necessary from the Habermas position since he sought to establish the form of critical reflection, whereas Foucault sought to establish only a form of critical reflection.

In response, many of Foucault's advocates argue the Habermasian critique presupposes what it seeks to show and that the critique is based on a misunderstanding of Foucault's work. In 1999, Ashenden and Owen published an edited volume of papers entitled Foucault contra Habermas: Recasting the dialogue between genealogy and critical theory in an attempt to re-engage the debate and shift the dialogue to new ground. Specifically, they aimed to 1) illuminate the stakes of the encounter between the different practices of critical reflection, 2) evaluate some major criticisms of genealogy made in the course of the debate, and 3) offer a critical response to Habermas' position from the perspective of Foucault's practice in relation to contemporary political-philosophical and political issues.

The publication of Foucault's Collège de France lectures over the past decade has also served to recast the Foucault–Habermas debate since the Ashenden and Owen volume. The lectures on biopolitics and governmentality, as well as Foucault's relation to Kant and neoliberalism has resulted in a number of scholars revisiting questions of normativity, resistance and critique in Foucault's work.

See also 
 Cassirer–Heidegger debate
 Gadamer–Derrida debate
 Positivism dispute
 Power (social and political)
 Rationality
 Rationality and Power
 Searle–Derrida debate

References

Bibliography 
 Ingram, David. "Foucault and Habermas on the Subject of Reason". In Gutting, Gary, ed. (1994). The Cambridge Companion to Foucault Cambridge: Cambridge University Press. pp. 215–261. .
 Kelly, Michael ed. (1994). Critique and Power: Recasting the Foucault/Habermas Debate. Cambridge: MIT Press. .

Continental philosophy
Jürgen Habermas
Michel Foucault
Philosophical debates